Auquihuato (possibly from Quechua, awki: prince, watu: prediction, fortuneteller)  is a cinder cone in the Andes of Peru,  high. It is situated in the Ayacucho Region, Paucar del Sara Sara Province, on the border of the districts Colta and Oyolo. Auquihuato lies northeast of Sara Sara volcano.

Geology

Context 
Auquihuato is surrounded by a Pliocene volcanic plateau, the cone formed on the plateau's southern margin. Auquihuato lies east of the main volcanic arc and is aligned with several other volcanic centres in a northwest-southeast line.

Volcano 
It has well developed levees.

Activity 
The stratovolcano developed during the Pleistocene and Holocene. The noticeable lava flow is of Holocene age but no radiometric dating is available and no historical eruptions are known. The Geophysical Institute of Peru began to monitor the geodesy of the system in 2019 and it is considered a low-hazard volcano.

The ground deformation may be caused by changes in the pressure within the volcano's magma system, at depths probably exceeding , but an origin in a hydrothermal system is also possible. Volcano-tectonic earthquakes have been recorded.

References

Volcanoes of Peru
Landforms of Ayacucho Region
Mountains of Peru
Mountains of Ayacucho Region
Four-thousanders of the Andes
Cinder cones